Halle Radio Tower is the tallest free-standing lattice tower exclusively used for radiotechnical purposes in Germany. It was built in 2005 by
Steffens & Nölle GmbH for the Deutsche Telekom AG in Halle, Saxony-Anhalt as DVB-T broadcasting tower. It is 150 metres tall.

See also 
 List of towers

External links 
 http://skyscraperpage.com/diagrams/?buildingID=63650
 http://en.structurae.de/structures/data/index.cfm?id=s0020907

Communication towers in Germany
Towers completed in 2005
2005 establishments in Germany